Farmington is a city in Van Buren County, Iowa, United States. The population was 579 at the time of the 2020 census.

History
Farmington was laid out in 1839. It was named after Farmington, Connecticut. The town was incorporated on January 11, 1841.

Farmington has suffered from several major floods of the Des Moines River, most notably in 1993, when a "500-year-flood" caused major damage to the buildings near the river, including a one-block area bordered by Walnut, Second, and Third Streets. The houses in this block were subsequently razed, and the property was purchased by the City of Farmington to create "Wild Rose City Park."

Geography
Farmington is located at  (40.6397, -91.7394), on the left (east) bank of the Des Moines River.

Demographics

2010 census
As of the census of 2010, there were 664 people, 299 households, and 170 families living in the city. The racial makeup of the city was 97.7% White, 0.3% African American, 0.8% Native American, 0.6% from other races, and 0.6% from two or more races. Hispanic or Latino of any race were 2.1% of the population.

There were 299 households, of which 28.1% had children under the age of 18 living with them, 42.1% were married couples living together, 9.7% had a female householder with no husband present, 5.0% had a male householder with no wife present, and 43.1% were non-families. 39.5% of all households were made up of individuals, and 22.8% had someone living alone who was 65 years of age or older. The average household size was 2.22 and the average family size was 2.95.

The median age in the city was 41.6 years. 24.4% of residents were under the age of 18; 6.8% were between the ages of 18 and 24; 21.4% were from 25 to 44; 25.6% were from 45 to 64; and 21.8% were 65 years of age or older. The gender makeup of the city was 49.2% male and 50.8% female.

2000 census
As of the census of 2000, there were 756 people, 330 households, and 192 families living in the city. The racial makeup of the city was 98.94% White, 0.13% Asian, and 0.93% from two or more races. Hispanic or Latino of any race were 0.26% of the population.

There were 330 households, out of which 26.4% had children under the age of 18 living with them, 48.5% were married couples living together, 5.2% had a female householder with no husband present, and 41.8% were non-families. 38.8% of all households were made up of individuals, and 24.5% had someone living alone who was 65 years of age or older. The average household size was 2.29 and the average family size was 3.00.

In the city, the population was spread out, with 25.7% under the age of 18, 6.3% from 18 to 24, 24.9% from 25 to 44, 21.3% from 45 to 64, and 21.8% who were 65 years of age or older. The median age was 40 years. For every 100 females, there were 90.4 males. For every 100 females age 18 and over, there were 93.8 males.

The median income for a household in the city was $26,354, and the median income for a family was $35,156. Males had a median income of $30,250 versus $21,406 for females. The per capita income for the city was $13,591. About 10.1% of families and 12.8% of the population were below the poverty line, including 14.2% of those under age 18 and 9.0% of those age 65 or over.

Education
The community is served by the Van Buren County Community School District. It was previously in the Harmony Community School District, until it merged into Van Buren County CSD on July 1, 2019.

Notable person
Voltaire P. Twombly, (1842-1918), Iowan politician, businessman and Medal of Honor recipient for the American Civil War, was born in Farmington.

Annual events
The Farmington Strawberry Festival is always held annually on the second full weekend in June, and is sponsored by the Farmington Arts Council.

References

External links
Farmington, Iowa Website Portal style website, Government, Business, Library, Recreation and more
City-Data.com Comprehensive Statistical Data and more about Farmington

Cities in Iowa
Cities in Van Buren County, Iowa